"Lady in Black" is a song by Bad Boys Blue, released in July 1989 as the lead single from their fifth studio album, The Fifth (1989).

Composition 

The song was written by Tony Hendrik and Karin Hartmann (as Karin van Haaren) and produced by Tony Hendrik and Karin Hartmann.

Track listing and formats 

 European 7-inch single

A. "Lady in Black" – 3:45
B. "Lady in Black" (Instrumental) – 3:45

 European 12-inch maxi-single

A. "Lady in Black" (Shakespearean Mix) – 6:08
B1. "Lady in Black" (Radio Edit) – 3:45
B2. "Lady in Black" (Instrumental) – 3:45

 German CD maxi-single

 "Lady in Black" (Shakespearean Mix) – 6:09
 "Don't Leave Me Now" – 6:12
 "Lady in Black" (Radio Edit) – 3:48
 "Lady In Black" (Instrumental) – 3:48

Charts

References 

1989 songs
1989 singles
Bad Boys Blue songs
Coconut Records singles
Songs written by Tony Hendrik